Adrien Anneet (15 November 1908 – ?) was a Belgian boxer who competed in the 1928 Summer Olympics. He was born in Brussels.

In 1928 he was eliminated in the second round of the welterweight class after losing his fight to Cor Blommers.

References

External links

Picture of Adrien Anneet

1908 births
Sportspeople from Brussels
Welterweight boxers
Olympic boxers of Belgium
Boxers at the 1928 Summer Olympics
Year of death missing
Belgian male boxers